Einmal ist keinmal is a German phrase which translates roughly as "once is never".  It may refer to: 

 Once Is Never, a 1955 East German film
 a phrase from The Unbearable Lightness of Being